Bangxing (Tibetan: སྤང་ཤིང་;Chinese: 旁辛; Pinyin: Bàngxīn) is a township in Medog County, Tibet Autonomous Region of the People's Republic of China. Its population in 2007 was 1,351, the town is located in the traditional province of Pemako, most of the inhabitants are Tshangla speakers.

See also
List of towns and villages in Tibet Autonomous Region

Notes

External links and references
NCIKU Comprehensive Chinese-English Dictionary

Populated places in Shigatse
Township-level divisions of Tibet